Shwe Nan Shin was governor of Myinsaing from  1344 to  1386. He was the eldest sibling of King Swa Saw Ke of Ava. He became governor of Myinsaing  1344 during the Pinya period. He was no longer governor of Myinsaing, certainly by 1390, and probably by 1386.

Ancestry
Shwe Nan Shin was descended from the Pagan royalty from both sides, and was a grandnephew of King Thihathu of Pinya.

Notes

References

Bibliography
 
 
 

Pinya dynasty
Ava dynasty